The 2006 ECAC Hockey Men's Ice Hockey Tournament was the 45th tournament in conference history. It was played between March 3 and March 18, 2006. Opening round and quarterfinal games were played at home team campus sites, while the final four games were played at the Pepsi Arena (subsequently renamed Times Union Center) in Albany, New York. By winning the tournament, Harvard received the ECAC's automatic bid to the 2006 NCAA Division I Men's Ice Hockey Tournament.

Conference standings
Note: GP = Games played; W = Wins; L = Losses; T = Ties; PTS = Points; GF = Goals For; GA = Goals Against

Bracket
Teams are reseeded after the First Round and Quarterfinals

Note: * denotes overtime period(s)

First round

(5) St. Lawrence vs. (12) Brown

(6) Union vs. (11) Yale

(7) Rensselaer vs. (10) Quinnipiac

(8) Clarkson vs. (9) Princeton

Quarterfinals

(1) Dartmouth vs. (11) Yale

(2) Colgate vs. (10) Quinnipiac

(3) Cornell vs. (8) Clarkson

(4) Harvard vs. (5) St. Lawrence

Semifinals

(1) Dartmouth vs. (4) Harvard

(2) Colgate vs. (3) Cornell

Third place

(1) Dartmouth vs. (2) Colgate

Championship

(3) Cornell vs. (4) Harvard

Tournament awards

All-Tournament Team
F Kevin Du (Harvard)
F Jimmy Fraser (Harvard)
F Dan Murphy (Harvard)
D Ryan O'Byrne (Cornell)
D Dylan Reese (Harvard)
G John Dagineau* (Harvard)
* Most Outstanding Player(s)

Tournament notes 

 Yale's five overtime win over Union remains the second longest game in tournament history

References

External links
ECAC Hockey

ECAC Hockey Men's Ice Hockey Tournament
ECAC tournament